Khandaker Abdul Jalil is a Bangladesh Nationalist Party politician and a Member of Parliament from Shariatpur-2.

Career
Jalil was elected to parliament from Shariatpur-2 as an Bangladesh Nationalist Party candidate in 15 February 1996.

References

Bangladesh Nationalist Party politicians
Date of birth missing (living people)
6th Jatiya Sangsad members